Zuniceratops ('Zuni-horned face') was a ceratopsian dinosaur from the mid Turonian of the Late Cretaceous Period of what is now New Mexico, United States. It lived about 10 million years earlier than the more familiar horned Ceratopsidae and provides an important window on their ancestry.

Description

The skull bears a well-developed pair of brow horns, similar to those of chasmosaurs and primitive centrosaurs, but the nose horn is absent. The brow horns are thought to have grown much larger with age. The snout is long and low, like that of chasmosaurines. The frill was a thin, broad, shield-like structure. It bore a pair of large holes but lacked epoccipital bones, as in Protoceratops. Overall, the anatomy is much more primitive than that of the ceratopsids, but more advanced than in protoceratopsids.

Discovery and species
Zuniceratops was discovered in 1996, by eight-year-old Christopher James Wolfe, son of paleontologist Douglas G. Wolfe, in the Moreno Hill Formation in west-central New Mexico. One skull and the bones from several individuals have been found. More recently, one bone, believed to be a squamosal, has since been found to be an ischium of a Nothronychus.

Classification
 
Zuniceratops is an example of the evolutionary transition between early ceratopsians and the later, larger ceratopsids that had very large horns and frills. This supports the theory that the lineage of ceratopsian dinosaurs may have been North American in origin.

Although the first specimen discovered had single-rooted teeth (unusual for ceratopsians), later fossils had double-rooted teeth. This is evidence that the teeth became double-rooted with age. Zuniceratops was a herbivore like other ceratopsians and was probably a herd animal as well.

See also

 Timeline of ceratopsian research

References

Wolfe, D. G. (2000). New information on the skull of Zuniceratops christopheri, a neoceratopsian dinosaur from the Cretaceous Moreno Hill Formation, New Mexico. pp. 93–94, in S. G. Lucas and A. B. Heckert, eds. Dinosaurs of New Mexico. New Mexico Museum of Natural History and Science Bulletin No. 17.

Coronosaurs
Late Cretaceous dinosaurs of North America
Taxa named by James I. Kirkland
Fossil taxa described in 1998
Paleontology in New Mexico
Turonian genus first appearances
Turonian genus extinctions
Ornithischian genera